Beto Brant (born 1964) is a Brazilian film director.

Filmography
Aurora (1987; short film)
Dov'è Meneghetti? (1989; short film)
Eternidad (1991; short film)
Jó (1993; short film)
Belly Up (1997)
Friendly Fire (1998)
The Trespasser (2001)
Delicate Crime (2005)
Stray Dog (2007)
Love According to B. Schianberg (2009)
I'd Receive the Worst News from Your Beautiful Lips (2011)

References

External links

1964 births
Brazilian film directors
Living people
People from Jundiaí